Jan Halvorsen may refer to:

Jan Frøystein Halvorsen (1928–2016), Norwegian judge
Jan Halvor Halvorsen (born 1963), Norwegian footballer and coach